Daniel Andersson (born 1986) is a Swedish politician and former member of the Riksdag, the national legislature. A member of the Social Democratic Party, he represented Örebro County] between September 2021 and September 2022. He has been a substitute member of the Riksdag for Matilda Ernkrans twice: January 2019 to September 2021 and September 2022 to October 2022.

Andersson was born and raised in Frövi. He was educated at a folk high school in Fellingsbro. He has been a member of the municipal council in Lindesberg Municipality since 2014. He worked as an after-school leader.

References

1986 births
Living people
Members of the Riksdag 2018–2022
Members of the Riksdag from the Social Democrats
People from Lindesberg Municipality